John Crewe, 1st Baron Crewe (27 September 1742 – 28 April 1829), of Crewe Hall in Cheshire, was a British politician. He is chiefly remembered for his sponsorship of Crewe's Act of 1782, which barred customs officers and post office officials from voting.

Early life
Crewe was the eldest son of John Crewe, Member of Parliament for Cheshire between 1734 and 1752, and grandson of John Offley Crewe who had also held the same seat before him. On his father's death in 1752 he succeeded to Crewe Hall.

Parliamentary career
In 1764 he was chosen High Sheriff of Cheshire, and he entered parliament at a by-election in 1765 as Whig member for Stafford; but at the next general election, in 1768, he was returned unopposed for Cheshire, which he represented for the next 34 years. He was never opposed for Cheshire, and presumably was highly regarded locally: the Dictionary of National Biography records that he was "an enlightened agriculturalist and a good landlord".

In the factional politics of the Whig Party, Crewe was initially a friend and follower of the Duke of Grafton, but later became a particular supporter of Charles James Fox, apparently subsidising him to the tune of £1200 a year. After Fox's resignation from office in 1782, the incoming administration considered offering Crewe some governmental office to secure his support, but were told that his only ambition was for a peerage. He remained loyal to Fox, and in February 1784 was on Fox's list of new peers to be made should he return to office as he hoped. Fox did not succeed in returning to power at that point, but eventually - four years after his retirement from the Commons - Crewe was rewarded with the desired peerage when Fox finally returned to office in 1806. Crewe was created Baron Crewe, of Crewe in the County Palatine of Chester on 25 February 1806.

Crewe rarely spoke in the House of Commons, and more than half his recorded contributions concerned a single measure, the Parliament Act of 1782 which thereafter bore his name. This was an attempt to curb a particular source of corruption in elections: in many of the rotten boroughs of the period, only a few votes were needed to swing elections, and it was common for those who held the power of appointment to various well-paid official posts to reserve these for voters in return for co-operation at election time. The scale of the problem may be judged by Prime Minister Rockingham's statement that 11,500 officers of customs and excise were electors, and that 70 Commons seats were decided chiefly by such votes. William Dowdeswell had attempted in 1770 to put a stop to this practice by preventing officers of the Custom, Excise and Post Office from voting. This measure had not reached the statute book, but Crewe introduced a bill with the same object in 1780 and again in 1781, succeeding on the latter occasion in passing it into law. Unfortunately, the new regulation was easily evaded, as the power of patronage was simply shifted to offer lucrative offices to the voters' relatives instead of to the voters themselves.

Private life
He married Frances Anne Greville, daughter of Fulke Greville (1717-1806) and Frances Macartney, in 1766, and they had two surviving children: 
 John, who succeeded him in the peerage, but became completely estranged from his family;
 Elizabeth Emma Crewe, who married Foster Cunliffe-Offley.

Lord Crewe died in 1829. His wife, usually known simply as "Mrs Crewe", was a noted political hostess. She died in 1818.

Arms

References

 
 Lewis Namier & John Brooke, The History of Parliament: The House of Commons 1754-1790 (London: HMSO, 1964)
 Edward Porritt and Annie G Porritt, The Unreformed House of Commons (Cambridge University Press, 1903)
 The Annual Biography and Obituary, 1830,  Volume XIV (London: Longman, Rees, Orme, Brown & Green, 1830) 
 

|-

1742 births
1829 deaths
Barons in the Peerage of the United Kingdom
Peers of the United Kingdom created by George III
Members of the Parliament of the United Kingdom for English constituencies
Members of the Parliament of Great Britain for Stafford
Whig (British political party) MPs for English constituencies
British MPs 1761–1768
British MPs 1768–1774
British MPs 1774–1780
British MPs 1780–1784
British MPs 1784–1790
British MPs 1790–1796
British MPs 1796–1800
UK MPs 1801–1802
UK MPs who were granted peerages
High Sheriffs of Cheshire